The 2017 Campeonato Alagoano is the 87th edition of the top football league in Alagoas. CRB became the champions for the 30th time and third straight time after defeating CSA over two legs, 4-2.

Format
First Phase
 The 10 teams are divided into 2 groups of 5 teams each
Each team plays all the teams from the other group twice - home and away - for a total of 10 games each.
First to third place of each group qualifies for Hexagonal
Fourth and fifth place of each group enter the relegation round.
Hexagonal Final
Each team plays the others once, for a total of 5 games each.
The top four teams qualify for the semi-finals.
Relegation Round
The four teams play each other twice.
The bottom two teams are relegated to the 2018 Campeonato Alagoano 2° Divisão.
Final Rounds
The advancing teams from the Hexagonal Final are paired according to their ranking:
1 vs. 4
2 vs. 3
The games are played over two legs, the winner being decided on aggregate.
The winners of the semi-finals go on to the finals.
The Final is played over two legs.
The team with the better record over the first phase, hexagonal Final, and the semi-finals hosts the second leg.
Qualification
The top two teams not already playing in Série A, Série B, or Série C, or already assured qualification to Série D qualify for the 2018 Campeonato Brasileiro Série D.
The winner, runner-up, and third place qualify for the 2018 Copa do Brasil.
The winner and runner-up qualifies for the 2018 Copa do Nordeste.

Teams

First phase

Group A

Group B

Hexagonal Final

Relegation round

Final Rounds

Semi-finals

CRB win on Aggregate 3-2.

CSA win on Aggregate 3-2.

Third-Place Final

ASA win on Aggregate 6-2.

Final

CRB win on Aggregate 4-2.

Murici and Santa Rita qualify for the 2018 Campeonato Brasileiro Série D.CRB, CSA, and ASA qualify for the 2018 Copa do Brasil.CRB and CSA qualify for the 2018 Copa do Nordeste.

References

2017 in Brazilian football leagues
Campeonato Alagoano